A Day on Mars (German: Ein Tag auf dem Mars) is a 1921 German silent sci-fi comedy film directed by Heinz Schall and starring Lilly Flohr, Hermann Picha and Gerhard Ritterband. It premiered in Berlin on 20 February 1921.

Cast
 Lilly Flohr as Filmstar / Mars-Prinzessin 
 Hermann Picha as Astronom Himmelswurm 
 Gerhard Ritterband as Famulus
 Hans Behrendt   
 Henri Peters-Arnolds

References

Bibliography
 Grange, William. Cultural Chronicle of the Weimar Republic. Scarecrow Press, 2008.

External links

1921 films
Films of the Weimar Republic
German silent feature films
German science fiction comedy films
1920s science fiction comedy films
Films directed by Heinz Schall
German black-and-white films
1921 comedy films
1920s German films
1920s German-language films
Silent science fiction comedy films